The Riverside Hangar is a historic hangar complex at the St. Paul Downtown Airport in Saint Paul, Minnesota, United States.  It comprises two parallel hangars with a connecting structure and some additions.  Built on the bank of the Mississippi River in 1942, it was part of a bomber modification center that operated at the airport during World War II.  The two hangar buildings were constructed with glued laminated timber arches, an innovation born of wartime steel shortages.  Their important design features were their low cost and that they were erectable quickly by unskilled workers.  Riverside Hangar was listed on the National Register of Historic Places for its state-level significance in the theme of engineering.  It was nominated for being one of Minnesota's leading examples of glued laminated timber construction.

Description

See also
 National Register of Historic Places listings in Ramsey County, Minnesota

References

1942 establishments in Minnesota
Aircraft hangars in the United States
Aircraft hangars on the National Register of Historic Places
Buildings and structures in Saint Paul, Minnesota
National Register of Historic Places in Saint Paul, Minnesota
Transport infrastructure completed in 1942
Transportation buildings and structures on the National Register of Historic Places in Minnesota
United States home front during World War II
World War II on the National Register of Historic Places